Altagonum is a genus of beetles in the family Carabidae, containing the following species:

 Altagonum avium Darlington, 1971
 Altagonum caducum Darlington, 1952
 Altagonum cheesmani Darlington, 1952
 Altagonum cracens Darlington, 1971
 Altagonum dilutipes Darlington, 1952
 Altagonum erugatum Darlington, 1971
 Altagonum europhilum Darlington, 1952
 Altagonum exutum Darlington, 1971
 Altagonum fatuum Darlington, 1952
 Altagonum flavicorne Louwerens, 1969
 Altagonum grossuloides Darlington, 1952
 Altagonum grossulum Darlington, 1952
 Altagonum japenox Darlington, 1952
 Altagonum latilimbus Darlington, 1952
 Altagonum magnox Darlington, 1952
 Altagonum misim Darlington, 1952
 Altagonum montanum Louwerens, 1956
 Altagonum noctellum Darlington, 1952
 Altagonum nox Darlington, 1952
 Altagonum nudicolle Darlington, 1952
 Altagonum pallinox Darlington, 1952
 Altagonum papuense (Sloane, 1890)
 Altagonum paralimbus Darlington, 1952
 Altagonum parascapha Darlington, 1971
 Altagonum paulum Darlington, 1970
 Altagonum planinox Darlington, 1952
 Altagonum postsulcatum Darlington, 1952
 Altagonum pubinox Darlington, 1952
 Altagonum regiscapha Darlington, 1952
 Altagonum scapha Darlington, 1952
 Altagonum sedlaceki Louwerens, 1969
 Altagonum sororium Darlington, 1971
 Altagonum sphodrum Darlington, 1952
 Altagonum stellaris Darlington, 1971
 Altagonum tenellum Darlington, 1971
 Altagonum tutum Darlington, 1952
 Altagonum vallicola Darlington, 1952
 Altagonum wegneri Louwerens, 1956

References

 
Platyninae